Arbnor Muja (born 29 January 1998) is a Kosovan professional footballer who plays as a left winger for Belgian club Antwerp.

Club career

Eintracht Braunschweig II
On 15 August 2018, Muja signed a two-year contract with Oberliga Niedersachsen club Eintracht Braunschweig II. Seventeen days later, he made his debut against Arminia Hannover after being named in the starting line-up and scored his side's second goal during a 3–3 home draw. One month after debut, he was named as a first team substitute for the first time in the 2018–19 Lower Saxony Cup quarter-finals against SV Drochtersen/Assel.

Skënderbeu Korçë
On 31 August 2019, Muja signed a two-year contract with Kategoria Superiore club Skënderbeu Korçë. Fourteen days later, he made his debut in a 3–1 away defeat against Tirana after coming on as a substitute at 41st minute in place of injured Gjergji Muzaka.

Return to Trepça '89 as loan
On 31 January 2020, Muja joined as loan to Kosovo Superleague club Trepça '89. One month later, he made his debut in a 3–0 away defeat against Feronikeli after being named in the starting line-up.

Drita
On 16 June 2021, Muja signed a three-year contract with Kosovo Superleague club Drita. On 8 July 2021, he made his debut with Drita in the 2021–22 UEFA Europa Conference League first qualifying round against the Montenegrin side Dečić after being named in the starting line-up, and assists in his side's second goal during a 2–1 home win.

Antwerp
On 28 July 2022, Belgian First Division A club Antwerp reached an agreement with Drita for the transfer of Muja and this deal was made a few minutes after Antwerp defeated Drita in the second leg of the 2022–23 UEFA Europa Conference League second qualifying round. Eight days later, the club confirmed that Muja's transfer was permanent and he received squad number 11. Antwerp reportedly paid a €400 thousand transfer fee, becoming the most expensive transfer in the history of the Kosovo Superleague. His debut with Antwerp came on 2 October in a 2–1 away defeat against Kortrijk after coming on as a substitute at 45th minute in place of Koji Miyoshi.

International career
On 4 October 2018, Muja received a call-up from Kosovo U21 for the 2019 UEFA European Under-21 Championship qualification match against Israel U21, and made his debut after coming on as a substitute at 64th minute in place of Muharrem Jashari.

References

External links

1998 births
Living people
Sportspeople from Mitrovica, Kosovo
Kosovan footballers
Kosovo under-21 international footballers
Kosovan expatriate footballers
Expatriate footballers in Germany
Kosovan expatriate sportspeople in Germany
Expatriate footballers in Albania
Kosovan expatriate sportspeople in Albania
Expatriate footballers in Belgium
Kosovan expatriate sportspeople in Belgium
Association football wingers
Football Superleague of Kosovo players
KF Trepça players
KF Trepça '89 players
FC Drita players
Oberliga (football) players
Eintracht Braunschweig II players
Kategoria Superiore players
KF Skënderbeu Korçë players
Belgian Pro League players
Royal Antwerp F.C. players